Josef Homeyer (1 August 1929 – 30 March 2010) was a German Bishop of the Roman Catholic Diocese of Hildesheim, located in Hildesheim, from his appointment by Pope John Paul II on 25 August 1983 until his retirement on 20 August 2004.

Biography
He was born in Harsewinkel, Münster, North Rhine-Westphalia, Germany. He died in Hildesheim, Germany, on 30 March 2010, at the age of 80.

One of his many activities was to set the foundation of the Forschungsinstitut für Philosophie Hannover in 1988.

In 2005 he got the Honorary citizenship of Hildesheim.

References

External links
Catholic Hierarchy: Bishop Josef Homeyer †
Bishop Josef Homeyer dies 

1929 births
2010 deaths
People from Harsewinkel
Roman Catholic bishops of Hildesheim
People from the Province of Westphalia
Commanders Crosses of the Order of Merit of the Federal Republic of Germany